His TV (aTV3) was a television channel produced by Asia Television, which broadcast from December 31, 2007, until April 1, 2009. It was founded by American Dan Moramarco. The channel closed after he had sold the company to Chinese investors.

History
His TV started test broadcasting on December 2, 2007, and official broadcasting on December 31, 2007. It could be watched only with a standard-definition television or better.  It closed on April 1, 2009, as Asia Television restructured their channels.

Program
His TV mainly targeted a male audience, with programs on topics such as sports, cars.

See also
 Her TV
 Plus TV

References 

Television stations in Hong Kong
Television channels and stations established in 2007